Martha Atwell (1900 – December 28, 1949) was an American radio director, known for her association with Frank and Anne Hummert.

Atwell directed episodes of a number of popular radio serials. For the Hummerts, these include:
Chaplain Jim USA
David Harum
Just Plain Bill
Lora Lawton
Mrs. Wiggs of the Cabbage Patch
Young Widder Brown
Mr. Keen, Tracer of Lost Persons
Mystery Theater

For other producers, she oversaw production of episodes of The Editor's Daughter, Hearts in Harmony, and Linda's First Love. Atwell rarely agreed to artists' special requests, running her productions according to the rules set down by the Hummerts. She was also noted for her insistence on punctuality. Others have described her as "wonderfully kind".

Atwell never married. Her death appears to have been a suicide; she was discovered floating in a bathtub in her apartment.

References

1900 births
1949 deaths
American radio directors
Women radio directors
1949 suicides
Suicides by drowning in the United States